USS Mason (DE-529), an , was the second ship of the United States Navy to be named Mason, though DE-529 was the only one specifically named for Ensign Newton Henry Mason. USS Mason was one of two US Navy ships with largely African-American crews in World War II. These two ships were manned by African Americans as the result of a letter sent to President Roosevelt by the NAACP in mid-December 1941. Entering service in 1944, the vessel was used for convoy duty in the Battle of the Atlantic for the remainder of the war. Following the war, Mason was sold for scrap and broken up in 1947.

Namesake 
Newton Henry Mason (24 December 1918 – May 1942) was a decorated United States Navy fighter pilot who was killed in action at the Battle of the Coral Sea.

Mason was born in New York City on 24 December 1918. He enlisted as a seaman in the United States Naval Reserve on 7 November 1940 and on 10 February 1941 was appointed an aviation cadet. Assigned to U.S. Navy Fighting Squadron 3 (VF-3) aboard the aircraft carrier  as a Grumman F4F Wildcat fighter pilot in September 1941, he reported to VF-3 while it was stationed at Marine Corps Air Station Ewa, Territory of Hawaii, in January 1942 after Saratoga had been damaged by a Japanese submarine torpedo.

Later reassigned to Fighting Squadron 2 (VF-2), Ensign Masons first and only aerial combat occurred during the Battle of the Coral Sea on 8 May 1942, when he disappeared during action with Imperial Japanese Navy aircraft and was declared missing in action, probably the victim of Mitsubishi A6M Zero fighters from the Japanese aircraft carrier Shōkaku.

Mason was posthumously awarded the Distinguished Flying Cross for his skill and courage in battle.

Service history
Mason'''s keel was laid down in the Boston Navy Yard, on 14 October 1943. She was launched on 17 November 1943, sponsored by Mrs. David Mason, the mother of Ensign Mason, and commissioned on 20 March 1944.

Following a shakedown cruise off Bermuda, Mason departed from Charleston, South Carolina, on 14 June, escorting a convoy bound for Europe, arriving at Horta Harbor, Azores, on 6 July. She got underway from Belfast, Northern Ireland, headed for the East Coast on 26 July, arriving at Boston Harbor on 2 August for convoy duty off the harbor through August.

On 2 September, she arrived at New York City to steam on 19 September in the screen for convoy NY.119. Mason reached Falmouth, Cornwall, with part of the convoy 18 October, and she returned to New York from Plymouth, England, and the Azores on 22 November.

On 18 October, Mason supported Convoy NY-119 in a severe North Atlantic storm. The ship suffered and self-repaired critical structural damage and still rescued ships from the convoy. The crew of Mason was not awarded a letter of commendation until 1994 for meritorious service during this action.Mason joined Task Force 64 at Norfolk, Virginia, on 17 December. Two days later she sailed in convoy for Europe, passing by Gibraltar on 4 January 1945 to be relieved of escort duties. Continuing to Algeria, she entered Oran on 5 January for the formation of Task Group 60.11. The escort ship cleared Oran 7 January. Four days later the Mason made radar contact with a surface target. She rang up full speed with all battle stations manned to attack the presumptive submarine, rammed, and dropped depth charges. Mason then steamed to Bermuda for repairs, entering St. George's Harbor on 19 January. Five days later she reached the New York Navy Yard.

On 12 February Mason departed Norfolk in convoy for the Mediterranean Sea, arriving off Gibraltar on 28 February. She cleared Oran 8 March to guard a convoy to Bermuda and Chesapeake Bay before returning to New York 24 March. After sonar exercises off New London, Connecticut, and fighter-director training with naval aircraft from Quonset Point, Rhode Island, she steamed from Norfolk 10 April with another convoy to Europe, leaving the convoy at Gibraltar 28 April. Mason was two days out of Oran en route to the East Coast when the end of World War II in Europe was announced on 8 May.Mason arrived at New York on 23 May for operations along the East Coast into July. From 28 July to 18 August she served as a school ship for the Naval Training Center, Miami, Florida. On 20 August she arrived at New London to be outfitted for long-range underwater signal testing in the Bermuda area into September. Mason departed from Bermuda on 8 September for Charleston, arriving there two days later. Mason was decommissioned on 12 October, was struck from the Naval Vessel Register on 1 November 1945, and was sold and delivered to New Jersey, on 18 March 1947 for scrapping.

 was named in honor of the African Americans on DE-529's crew, and the 2004 film Proud dramatizes their story.

 References 

 
 Kelly, Mary Pat (1999). Proudly We Served: The Men of the USS Mason.'' Annapolis: US Naval Institute Press. .

External links
 
 Photo gallery at the Naval History & Heritage Command
 Photo gallery at Navsource.org

1943 ships
African-American history of the United States military
Evarts-class destroyer escorts
Ships built in Boston
World War II frigates and destroyer escorts of the United States